La Vie de Bohème is an 1851 French novel by Henri Murger.

La Vie de Bohème may also refer to:

 La Bohème (1916 film)
 La Vie de Bohème (1945 film), French-Italian film from 1945
 La Vie de Bohème (1992 film), 1992 French film
 La Vie de Bohème (album), studio album by jazz pianist Dave Burrell
 "La Vie Bohème", a song from the musical Rent

See also 
 Bohemian (disambiguation)
 La bohème (disambiguation)
 La Vida Bohème, a Venezuelan band